is a Japanese footballer currently playing as a goalkeeper for Kataller Toyama.

Career statistics

Club
.

Notes

References

External links

1996 births
Living people
Osaka Gakuin University alumni
Japanese footballers
Association football goalkeepers
J3 League players
Cerezo Osaka players
Cerezo Osaka U-23 players
Kataller Toyama players